The Mystery at Devil's Paw is Volume 38 in the original The Hardy Boys Mystery Stories published by Grosset & Dunlap.

This book was written for the Stratemeyer Syndicate by James Duncan Lawrence (who also authored the majority of the Tom Swift Jr. series) in 1959. Between 1959 and 1973 the first 38 volumes of this series were systematically revised as part of a project directed by Harriet Adams, Edward Stratemeyer's daughter. The original version of this book was shortened in 1973 by Priscilla Baker-Carr resulting in two slightly different stories sharing the same title.

Plot summary
Frank and Joe Hardy receive a telegram from their friend Tony saying that he is in danger in Alaska and needs their help. He also suggests bringing the brothers' friend, Chet Morton. At the airport they find a person following them and spying on them and they are attacked. Later the police discover that the attacker was a wanted spy: Romo Stransky.

Arriving in Alaska, they meet Ted Sewell, Tony's helper, and he leads the boys to Tony's camp. During the trip, Ted tells the boys about how his father disappeared and he wants them to help him find him.

At camp, Tony tells the boys that they have been attacked several times by a gang. During a search of the island, they find a knapsack, a map and a piece of jade. They later learn of a gang member going to The Devil's Paw — a place in British Columbia.

At The Devil's Paw they learn of an ancient Indian burial site where people would steal gold and jewelry. The brothers remember the piece of jade they found in the knapsack, and think it might have been stolen from the burial site. They locate the ancient burial site and also find Ted Sewell's father.

They find the camp of the gang and learn that the mysterious gang was searching for a lost rocket. They are captured, but escape with the help of their friend Chet. A radio call to the infantry leads to the arrest of the gang.

References

The Hardy Boys books
1959 American novels
1959 children's books
1973 American novels
1973 children's books
Novels set in Alaska
Novels set in British Columbia
Grosset & Dunlap books